Shino may refer to:

People
George Shenton (footballer) (1899–1978), English footballer nicknamed Shino
Shino Correa, a Latin musician in Grupo Aguakate
, Japanese actress
, Japanese women's professional footballer 
Shino Lin (林曉培, born 1973), Taiwanese singer and actress
, Japanese women's professional footballer 
, Japanese women's professional shogi player
, Japanese ballet dancer
, Japanese writer
, Japanese voice actress
Shino VanHoose (born 1995), American mixed martial artist
, Japanese artist 
, Japanese modern pentathlete
Shino Yanagisawa (born 1974), Japanese luger

Fictional characters
Shino (志乃), young village woman in the 1954 film Seven Samurai played by Keiko Tsushima
Shino (Pita-ten), character from the manga and anime series Pita-Ten
Shino Aburame, a character from the manga and anime series Naruto
Shino, a character from the anime series .hack//Roots
Shino, a character from the game Izuna: Legend of the Unemployed Ninja
Shino Ebizuka, character from the Eroge visual novel and OVA Underbar Summer
Shino Okazaki, character from the Clannad visual novel
Shino Asada, a character from the Sword Art Online light novels

Other things
Oshnavieh or Shno, also called Shino, a town in northwestern Iran
Shino ware, Japanese pottery

Japanese feminine given names